Đò Quan Bridge goes across Đào River, a branch of the Red River in Nam Định, Vietnam, an antique city 90 km South to Hanoi. The bridge was in inauguration in 1994 and serves to connect the city with the 6 other districts. 433 meter long and 15 meters wide, Đò Quan used to be the largest bridge in Nam Định Province before the appearance of Tân Đệ Bridge. This bridge is regarded as a cultural part of Nam Định.

References

Buildings and structures in Nam Định province
Bridges in Vietnam